The Mimeo Revolution (or Mimeograph Revolution) of the 1960s and 70s was an active period of small-scale, non-commercial, literary publishing facilitated by the accessibility of the mimeograph. It is distinguished from the traditional private press by its emphasis on quick, cheap production.

Presses associated with the Mimeo Revolution often published experimental and underground work, and were important venues for poets, writers and artists ignored by mainstream magazines. Their emphasis was often (but not always) on poetry, including work by the Black Mountain poets, the poets of the Beat Generation, the New York School, and the San Francisco Renaissance, as well as such experimental genres as Concrete Poetry. Unlike mainstream literary magazines, they were usually published by the poets and communities of poets whose work appeared in them. They were alsp widely used by grass roots groups, especially campus-based groups, opposing the Vietnam War during the 1960s and 1970s to announce upcoming demonstrations, fund raising events as well as regular communications with their memberships through newsletters, emergency announcements, etc. The low cost of acquiring a (usually used) machine, and the reliability low cost and ease of operation made the medium very attractive for groups  with limited resources producing up to a few hundred copies per stencil. Experiments with color inks developed in the art community were often used to enhance the predictable and drab looking copies and attract what we'd now call "eyeballs", often resulting in broadening the appeal of the messages appearing in announcements of demonstrations and/or fund raising events.

Significant Mimeo Revolution magazines and presses include 7 Flowers Press, Angel Hair, Beatitude, Big Table, “C” Press, Duende, Floating Bear, Fuck You, L=A=N=G=U=A=G=E, Little Caesar, Ole', Toothpaste, White Rabbit Press, Wormwood Review and Yugen.

See also
Samizdat
Alternative newspaper

External links
 A Little History of the Mimeograph Revolution, an excerpt from A Secret Location on the Lower East Side: Adventures in Writing, 1960-1980, by Steven Clay and Rodney Phillips, New York Public Library/Granary Books, 1998
 Granary Books site for A Secret Location on the Lower East Side: Adventures in Writing, 1960-1980
 How an Obsolete Copy Machine Started a Revolution by Greta Weber, National Geographic, June 24, 2016

Publishing
Revolutions by type